The 2017 Okolo Slovenska was a five-day cycling stage race that took place in Slovakia between 7 and 11 June 2017. The race was the 61st edition of the Okolo Slovenska; it was rated as a 2.1 event as part of the 2017 UCI Europe Tour, an upgrade from 2.2 in 2016. The race included four stages and a race-opening prologue individual time trial, starting in Levoča and finishing in Trnava.

The race was won by Slovenian rider Jan Tratnik, riding for the  team.

Schedule
The race route was announced on 5 April 2017.

Participating teams
Twenty-five teams participated in the 2017 edition of the Okolo Slovenska. These included five UCI Professional Continental teams, sixteen UCI Continental teams and four national teams.

Stages

Prologue
7 June 2017 — Levoča, individual time trial (ITT)

Stage 1
8 June 2017 — Levoča to Banská Bystrica,

Stage 2
9 June 2017 — Banská Bystrica to Nitra,

Stage 3
10 June 2017 — Nitra to Trnava,

Stage 4
11 June 2017 — Trnava to Trnava,

Classification leadership table
In the 2017 Tour of Slovakia, five different jerseys were awarded. The general classification was calculated by adding each cyclist's finishing times on each stage, and allowing time bonuses for the first three finishers at intermediate sprints (three seconds to first, two seconds to second and one second to third) and at the finish of mass-start stages; these were awarded to the first three finishers on all stages: the stage winner won a ten-second bonus, with six and four seconds for the second and third riders respectively. The leader of the classification received a yellow jersey; it was considered the most important of the 2017 Tour of Slovakia, and the winner of the classification was considered the winner of the race.

There was also a mountains classification, the leadership of which was marked by a white jersey with red polka dots. In the mountains classification, points towards the classification were won by reaching the top of a climb before other cyclists. Each climb was categorised as either first, or third-category, with more points available for the higher-categorised climbs; however points were awarded to the top three riders in both categories.

Additionally, there was a points classification, which awarded a white jersey with blue polka dots. In the points classification, cyclists received points for finishing in the top 10 in a stage, with the exception of the prologue. For winning a stage, a rider earned 10 points, with 9 for second, 8 for third and so on, down to 1 point for 10th place. Points towards the classification could also be accrued – awarded on a 3–2–1 scale – at intermediate sprint points during each stage; these intermediate sprints also offered bonus seconds towards the general classification as noted above.

The fourth jersey represented the classification for young riders, marked by a white jersey. This was decided the same way as the general classification, but only riders born after 1 January 1995 were eligible to be ranked in the classification. The fifth and final jersey represented the classification for Slovakian riders, marked by a white, blue and red jersey. This was decided the same way as the general classification, but only riders born in Slovakia were eligible to be ranked in the classification. There was also a team classification, in which the times of the best three cyclists per team on each stage were added together; the leading team at the end of the race was the team with the lowest total time.

References

External links
 

2017
2017 in Slovak sport
2017 UCI Europe Tour
Okolo Slovenska